The Sudbury dike swarm, also called the Sudbury dikes, is a Mesoproterozoic dike swarm in northeastern Ontario, Canada. With an age of 1,238 million years, it is younger than the Sudbury Basin impact event and predates the impact event that formed Lake Wanapitei.

References

Dike swarms
Igneous petrology of Ontario
Geology of Greater Sudbury
Mesoproterozoic magmatism